Renton may refer to:

People 
 Alex Renton (born 1961), British-Canadian author and journalist
 Dave Renton (born 1972), a British barrister and historian
 David Renton (1908–2007), a British politician
 David Malcolm Renton (1878-1947), an American builder and business executive
 Frank Renton (born 1939), British musician, conductor and broadcaster
 Kris Renton (born 1990), Scottish football player
 Kristen Renton (born 1982), American actress
 Polly Renton (1970–2010), British documentary film maker
 Tim Renton, Baron Renton of Mount Harry (1932–2020), British politician

Fictional people 
 Mark Renton, protagonist of the novel Trainspotting by Irvine Welsh, and the film adaptation by Danny Boyle
 Renton Thurston, protagonist of anime Eureka Seven

Places 
 Renton, Ontario, a hamlet located in Canada in Norfolk County
 Renton, Washington, a city located in King County, Washington
 Renton, West Dunbartonshire, a village in Scotland in the West Dunbartonshire council area

Sports
 Renton F.C.